George Adams Post (September 1, 1854 – October 31, 1925) was a Democratic member of the U.S. House of Representatives from Pennsylvania.

Early life
George Adams Post was born in Cuba, New York. He pursued an academic course at Oswego Academy. He moved to Susquehanna Depot, Pennsylvania. He was secretary of the motive power department of the Erie Railway. He was elected burgess in February 1877 and served one year. He studied law, was admitted to the bar in 1881 and commenced practice in Montrose, Pennsylvania. He was one of the owners and editors of the Montrose Democrat from 1883 to 1889.

Career
Post was elected as a Democrat to the Forty-eighth Congress. He was a delegate to the 1884 Democratic National Convention. He served as chairman of the Democratic State convention in 1885. He moved to New York City in 1889, and engaged as a writer for the New York World. He was engaged in the manufacture of railway equipment in 1892 and served as vice president and later president of the Standard Coupler Company. He was the founder and president of the Railway Business Association, and served as chairman of the railroad committee of the United States Chamber of Commerce. He died in Somerville, New Jersey, in 1925. Interment in Evergreen Cemetery in Oswego, New York.

See also
Politics of the United States
Politics of Pennsylvania

Sources

The Political Graveyard

1854 births
1925 deaths
Pennsylvania lawyers
Democratic Party members of the United States House of Representatives from Pennsylvania
People from Cuba, New York
People from Susquehanna County, Pennsylvania
19th-century American lawyers